Masikryong Ski Resort is a ski resort at the summit of the  Taehwa Peak some  outside Wonsan City in Kangwon Province, North Korea.

According to the official project plan, the first stage of the  development cost US$35,340,000 (£21 million; €25.5 million) and included construction of a luxury hotel, ice rink, swimming pool and restaurants. Official revenue forecasts suggest that 5,000 people will visit each day, generating an estimated annual income of $18,750,000 (£11.1 million; €13.5 million). The Masikryong (literally, "horse-resting pass") project was initiated by the North Korean government as part of a drive to "make people not only possess strong physiques and sound mentality, but also enjoy their sports and cultural lives in a world’s advanced condition (sic)."

Despite political tensions with neighbouring South Korea, leaders in the North hoped to host some events at the 2018 Winter Olympics.  Constructed in just ten months, North Korea's first public ski resort was part of a drive by leader Kim Jong-un to increase foreign tourist numbers from 200,000 to 1 million per annum by 2016.

Local environment 
A gentle slope on the western side of the ridge contrasts with a sharp descent to the east.

The area is home to a wide variety of deciduous trees including oak and lime. It snows on the ridge from mid-November until early April.

Facilities 

Along with nine beginner to intermediate level pistes, the site includes a ski school and kindergarten as well as a children's snow park. The on-resort Masikryong Hotel has a swimming pool and sauna, massage room, beauty parlour, billiards room, restaurants and an ice-skating rink. There is also a helipad across from the hotel.

Designed by the Pyongyang Architectural Institute, the 120-room hotel has twin pyramidal towers with the taller of the two having nine floors. Conversion of the Kalma airforce base in nearby Wonsan into an international airport is underway as part of plans to create a special tourism area with the Masikryong resort as a major attraction.

Cultural impact 
Soldiers of the Korean People’s Army constructed the resort in only ten months, giving rise to the new slogan "Masikryong speed", which has become a symbol of national pride as well as a propaganda device. The Daily Telegraph observed that "Masikryong speed" is a throwback to the Stakhanovite Chollima Movement introduced by former North Korean leader Kim Il-sung following the Korean War (19501953).

Controversy 
A US$7.5 million (£4.5 million; €5.5 million) deal with a Swiss ski-lift manufacturer was blocked in August 2013 after the country's government issued a directive based on United Nations Security Council Resolution 2094, itself a response to North Korea’s January 2013 nuclear test, that prohibited export sales of  “installations for infrastructure and equipment for sports facilities with a luxury character.” A spokesperson from Switzerland’s State Secretariat for Economic Affairs (Seco) described the resort as a “prestigious propaganda project for the [North Korean] regime.” The Korean Central News Agency responded with a statement saying: "This is an intolerable mockery of the social system and the people of the DPRK and a serious human rights abuse that politicizes sports and discriminates against the Koreans."

The resort opened the same year, featuring a 30-year-old Austrian-made gondola lift, retired from Ischgl, that China supplied to North Korea. China's interpretation of the international sanctions excludes ski resorts from the banned "luxury" category.

See also 

Tourism in North Korea

References 

Bibliography

External links
 

2014 establishments in North Korea
Kangwon Province (North Korea)
Ski areas and resorts in North Korea